Wenquan is a town in and the seat of Wen County in western Henan province, China, located about  north of the Yellow River. , it has 29 villages under its administration.

See also 
List of township-level divisions of Henan

References 

Township-level divisions of Henan
Wen County, Henan